The Dayeh Takashimaya Department Store is a department store in Shilin District, Taipei, Taiwan that opened on 1 November 1994. Main core stores include Muji, Books Kinokuniya, Jasons Market Place and various themed restaurants. The department store was originally jointly operated by Dayeh Group and Takashimaya, but on 17 May 2016, Takashimaya announced that it has decided to sell all the stakes to Dayeh Group, but the name of the department store remained unchanged.

See also
 List of tourist attractions in Taipei

References

External links 

1994 establishments in Taiwan
Buildings and structures in Tainan
Department stores of Taiwan
Commercial buildings completed in 1994
Retail companies established in 1994